Torture Money is a 1937 American short crime film directed by Harold S. Bucquet. In 1938, it won an Oscar for Best Short Subject, Two-reel at the 10th Academy Awards.

Cast
 Edwin Maxwell as Milton Beacher
 George Lynn as Larry Martin

References

External links

1937 films
1937 crime films
1937 short films
American crime films
Live Action Short Film Academy Award winners
Metro-Goldwyn-Mayer short films
American black-and-white films
Films directed by Harold S. Bucquet
1930s English-language films
1930s American films